The book North to the Pole, written by Will Steger and Paul Schurke, was published in 1986. It is a first-person account of an expedition to the North Pole and illustrates how seven men and one woman set out by dog-sled to accomplish the goal of completing the first "unsupported"   expedition to the North Pole. "Unsupported" in that case means without resupply and only with the help of traditional navigation systems. The expedition is successfully completed within 56 days, and the crew is much praised and celebrated for it, especially by the media.

After three years of planning, preparing and training the expedition starts on March 1, 1986. The crew around Steger and Co. charter a plane from Frobisher Bay on Baffin Island in Canada's eastern Arctic to leave to Ellesmere Island, from where they are starting their expedition to the North Pole. On board the plane are the crew, the sled dogs, equipment and supplies. Their take-off and departure to Ellesmere Island is accompanied by a media team. The expedition is financed through fundraising and donations.

The crew
The book contains biographical information about the two leading figures of that expedition, Schurke and Steger, who are the two initiators and authors of the book.         

 
“Ever since I was a child, I had dreamed about the remote places of the world, like the one the North Star leads to. I believe I was a born explorer."- Will Steger

Will Steger was born as the second oldest of nine children and grew up in the suburbs of Minneapolis. His parents supported his curiosity and allowed him the freedom to explore from an early age on. While other adolescents turned their interests to sports, Steger was "drawn ever more steadily toward the outdoors and adventure". He then studied geology at St. Thomas in St. Paul and got a master's degree in education. He constantly spent his summers in the north and decided at the age of 25 to move north to a remote tract of land. He started to lead wilderness trips and workshops there and finally started his own winter business in 1973, where he would introduce young people to dogsledding, snowshoeing and skiing and led winter camping trips.

“It’s not the size of your resources or abilities that counts, it’s the size of your dreams"- Paul Schurke

Paul Schurke, the co-leader of the expedition, was born and raised in Minneapolis. Similar to Steger, he also showed a great interest in adventure from an early age on. During his youth he became involved in many outdoor education programs. After graduating from St. John's University in 1977, he and a friend founded a nonprofit program that offered wilderness adventure trips. In 1980 he met Will Steger while looking for a winter outlet and they started planning their expedition.

The rest of the crew consists of Ann Bancroft, Bob McKerrow, Geoff Carroll, Richard Weber, Bob Mantell, and Brent Boddy.

Plot summary
The book, written in the style of a diary, includes the description of the eight- week expedition to the North Pole. In addition, it provides extra information about the preparations and training of the crew in form of an epilogue and a prologue.

The first week
The expedition begins on March 8 with temperatures around −70 degrees. The first week mainly consists of practicing routines, getting used to the harsh weather conditions and carrying out the daily routines of walking, camping and preparing running, all the while making a few miles of progress. The crew, which splits up into two teams for the expedition, quickly gets to experience "the real challenge" of the expedition, the pack ice and the physical hardships, such as frostbites, stiff hands and plagued feet. Especially the nights are hard to endure for the crew. The only actions that bring "circulation to the cramped legs" are loading sleds and harnessing dogs. During the first week the crew also experiences that the cold and the extreme temperatures become relative; a −60-degree morning suddenly does not feel too bad anymore. Nevertheless, even though they got used to the cold, the temperatures once again frustrate the crew, especially the dogs, which causes an accident between the dogs Chester and Zap. The weather conditions fluctuate for the rest of the week and they still have a hard time acclimatizing and adjusting to the severe cold. To boost their energy along the way to the Pole, they are on a special diet. On day 4 the crew decides to reduce the payload "to avoid burning out the dogs" to 1000 pounds and they start to alternate the chores among the team. They establish a team meeting for every morning, which is used to discuss the plan of the day and specific issues and also serves as a chance for the team to "vent frustrations and anxiety". The crew decides to split up into two teams and is moving the camp forward for the rest of the week and is slowly adjusting to the extreme temperatures and to their routines in the next days.

The second week
On the first morning of the second week Steger’s team awakes too late, throwing them off their tight schedule. On that day they experience the shifting of the ice for the first time. "We must be entering the shear zone" says Boddy on that day and by that "sending a wave of nervous tension through the group". Moreover, on day 9 of the expedition, they find out that they are running on a shortage of fuel which would directly jeopardize their goal of reaching the North Pole. This shortage sparks a debate about their general usage of fuel. Steger predicts though that they will be fine, because he estimates that their fuel usage would cut in half in the second half of the expedition. The terrain they are travelling on in the second week of the trip is one of the worst ones they have encountered so far and Steger and Schurke decide to "cut back on tent time" and thereby improve camp efficiency to reach the Pole before the ice gives in. That decision is not supported by every team member and both groups have different views on specific issues, but the severe conditions do not allow much time for discussing the differences. Scouting is another practice that becomes more and more important that week. Whenever they are in a difficult spot, three or four team members would scout to find the best route. On day twelve Steger and Schurke decide to economize chore time again to be able to spend more time on the sleds and to reach the North Pole before spring time. Steger and Co. also plan their first dog- pickup flight, which is scheduled for April 1 and which results in a change of rations for the dogs to extend the reserves. They are taking a rest day on Day 13 and they are going into week three with a new routine, consisting of a new rhythm regarding time management.

The third week
The first day of week three is the best day they have had so far. They move forward ten miles that day and through "more and more open spaces" travelling becomes more convenient. After days of tensions in the team, the mood between the crew is getting better again. However, the weather is not during the rest of the week. The crew is caught in a whiteout, which makes travelling more complicated and hard to find the trail, causing them to rest. They use the pause to rest and to repair equipment and they sit out the storm in "relative comfort, feeling content and thankful for this reprieve", but nevertheless are aware that if that carries on for more days that their tight schedule is not going to work out. They are able to continue their travels the next day, well rested and with new strength and power to make progress, though. The ice conditions become worse the more they head north and they encounter huge ice blocks and snow drifts, which causes frustration and opens space for conflicts among the crew again. Steger and the crew decide to alternate the chores and duties again to decrease the upcoming tensions for the rest of the journey.

The fourth week
The fourth week starts with a new system that enables each crew member twelve hours of tent time. On that first day they make eight miles of progress. McKerrow also announces the decision to leave the expedition on April 1, due to health issues. The mood changes thereby and scepticism among the crew increases. It is McKerrow himself who holds an empowering speech and who "sets all of [them] on fire" again. For the airlift the next day they plan to not only send some dogs home, but also gear that is not needed anymore to reduce the payload and to make lighter travelling possible. They have a party in the tents that night to celebrate McKerrow's last night. The airlift is set for 1:00 pm for the next day and is accompanied by a media team. Sad but more determined than ever, the crew starts the sleds again to head northward. They are now seven people and 42 dogs. A new constellation brings new routines and they rearrange loading time and pacing. They also benefit from lengthening hours of daylight that enable them to travel well into nighttime and weather conditions become more moderate that week. They encounter a first sign of wildlife in the Arctic when seeing fox tracks and decide to start carrying their rifles in case they experience it face- to- face. They have to take another rest at the end of the day that week because they want to give their dogs the opportunity to get some rest, since they are barely moving anymore and not making much progress.

The rifth week
The week begins with Steger’s team waiting out "impatiently" a "clear"(213) day. Steger is without "resupply". They decide which 21 dogs would be going to the Pole and agree with the plan that they will have a second rest stop in three days to prevent another burnout. They come up with a "final dash" like Peary's team: the dash is supposed to take place after the next dog pickup which is on April 9, when they expect “to be nearing 86 degrees”. The plan requires that they do twelve-hour and 20-mile-plus days to reach "the Pole by the end of April". Steger notices the effects of the tough conditions on his colleagues. Mantell has the most serious injury: “Three toes on his right foot and four on his left were blackened, swollen and festering”. Due to his enormous pain, Mantell decides to return home on the next dog-pickup flight. Richard discovers ski tracks; they belong to: Jean- Louis Etienne, the French explorer. Stunned about this coincidence, Etienne shows the Steger team his "home" meaning his tent. Steger learns that his goal is to become the first person to ski alone to the North Pole. Shocked about how fragile the landscape is, the cracks in the ice become more frequent and bigger- the lead would stretch on for miles. On Day 35 the plane arrives: “Five people, including our base manager, Jim Gasperini, Karl and his copilot, and two media representatives, National Geographic photographer Jim Brandenburg and his colleague Lynn Peterson, greeted us with warm hugs". Continuing northward, Steger thinks they would never reach the Pole. During a team meeting they discuss their diet and how to reduce the payload. By the end of the conference, the relief that still all seven people can go to the Pole dominates.

The sixth week
After breakfast, they meet in Schurke's tent. They have decided to drop nearly 300 pounds. Weber thinks they are giving up too easily. A "twenty- day man- haul plan" from his diary- this plan would put all seven of them to the Pole accompanied by a few dogs.Steger is concerned that they have "starvation rations pulling heavy sleds". The group decides for the "assault team" proposal of Steger and Schurke and not for Weber's proposal. The question of who could be the third person (besides Schurke and Steger) arises. Mantell is not sure if his feet can get him to the Pole. He decides with sorrow to leave the team. Schurke hears the radio check over breakfast: Etienne has scheduled a flight in four days, April 16- this would be the flight for Mantell who is leaving the team. Steger considers this day as a turning point of the expedition since they have finally arranged "a match between weight and power", regarding the loads on the sleds. On Day 38, Schurke and Steger have a discussion since Steger has lost the urgency. To Schurke the driving source to reach his goal is the death of his older brother Mark being killed in a car accident five months before.  Bancroft has an accident: the snow on which she stands gives way and she dips waist- deep into the ocean. She is fine after this incident so that anyone barely mentions it in their diary; however in the media it becomes the most reported episode of their journey. Steger talks about the proposal to give the rations of the third person to the dogs. He wants to reduce tensions because he wants to get all of the team members to the Pole. However, they are angry and call it a "Steger- Schurke plot" for putting just themselves to the Pole.

The seventh week
The team receives a call from Hans Weber, Weber’s father: he says that they have to be careful in the area of the Lomonosov Ridge. The ice in this area above the ridge is broken. Jim from the Resolute base interrupts this conversation; he does not want that this information gets passed to them. The team is concerned that this was a warning. On Day 44 they encounter indeed a zone of fractured ice. They set up camp at a lead hoping that it will close or freeze overnight. The next day, they travel to 88 degrees. Entering the last two degrees of latitude, it becomes obvious that from this position, Peary "launched his final dash" in 1909.  On Day 47 it becomes apparent that The National Geographic will be the first to break the news if they reach the top of the Pole. On Day 48 they launch their dash at 6. 30 AM. Steger gets more understanding for the human body and more empathy for people who suffer from illness and hunger everyday due to his digestive problems. By the end of the week, they camp that night 100 miles within the Pole. They realize that the last 60 miles could be the most difficult.

The eighth week
Schurke spends much time with the sextant and has to correct their course two times. Now it is important to be targeted for the Pole precisely. While Steger is being in a healthy state due to his new diet, the other team members are suffering from sore feet. One of their eskimo dogs collapses. After a ten- hour- march, they are only thirty miles distant from the Pole. The team is excited and continues on as far as they have energy since otherwise the Transpolar Drift Stream would take them farther away from the Pole if they set up camp and sleep. On Day 53 they leave at 7.00 am but they have to stop four hours later because Schurke has to take a long series with the sextant. After hours he has solved the navigational problems. A Canadian military jet ("Aurora") arrives: the pilot asks them if they still stick to their rules that they do not need any assistance. On Day 54 their dog- food supplies are almost exhausted. Critter, Mantell’s dog dies due to heartsickness. On Day 55 they are now ten miles distant from the Pole; they set off already the satellite beacon for National Geographic. "We’re at the Pole", Boddy shouts out finally on Day 56. They celebrate with a firecracker and receive the message that three planes will be arriving there the next day.

Epilogue
Steger's team is busy taking group photos and giving interviews when the three planes are landing at the North Pole. They get a lot of media attention: “A mob of reporters poured out onto the ice”. One of the pilots reassures Schurke that his electronic navigation agrees with his sextant readings and congratulates him. The explorer team poses for photographs with the flags of the United States, Canada and New Zealand. Bancroft reads an emotional statement: she thanks everyone who has supported their journey and stresses the dogs as “the real heroes”. Finally, she concludes the speech with the dedication to Bob Mantell and Bob McKerrow who have left the team. In the end, the team takes the flight back to Resolute base where they meet their families again.

The expedition in the media
The National Geographic reported in an article by Dave Freeman in 2015 that Will Steger received the "John Oliver La Groce Medal" in 1995 which is an award "only been given 19 times since National Geographic was founded in 1888". Steger follows the important explorers Roald Amundsen, Amelia Earhart, Admiral Robert Peary and Jacques- Yves Cousteau in gaining this honor. In 1996, Will Steger received an award by "National Geographic" to be "National Geographic’s first “explorer in- residence". On May 6, 1986, the New York Times reported about the expedition with an article by Christopher S. Wren titled "Back from Pole, explorer describes grueling trek". In this article, Ann's accident as well as Schurke's readings for the navigation are emphasized besides Steger's first comments on the journey. In 1989, the journal Sports Illustrated published the article "The Iceman Cometh" by Robert Sullivan reporting about Steger's trip to the Pole. There are still a lot of reports about Steger's expedition on several websites like the ones from The American Polar Society, National Geographic and the International Polar Foundation.

Motifs

Gender
Michael Robinson (2015) points out in his article "Manliness and Exploration" that "Gradually over the course of the nineteenth century, polar exploration had come to represent a place of manly contest rather than scientific investigation". In Steger’s team there is Bancroft as a female contribution to the male dominated North Pole exploration domain. In the first week, Bancroft's character is introduced and Steger writes about how she joined the team. His male opinion is shown as well as his critical attitude that a woman would cover the eighth spot in the expedition team: “Our concern centered on protecting our credibility. To add a woman would magnify press coverage of the project, but would leave us vulnerable to accusations of tokenism”. Steger is afraid that their credibility in the media would diminish just because a woman joins their team. This is also shown by Steger’s thought: “But what if she couldn’t adjust to being with seven men, or couldn’t handle the physical demands of the polar sea?”  A female arctic explorer is reduced to her femininity and the men fear that she is not able to manage the severe circumstances. On the other hand, Bancroft fulfills the role of a female family member: “But we felt that female representation would lead to a stronger sense of “family” among the group and add to the significance of the project”. In Robinson's essay (2015), the role of Elsa Barker being a ghostwriter for the Arctic explorer Robert Peary is discussed: in this context, the article speaks of “Women’s sentimental literature”  which was supposed to improve the male stories from the explorer and to add more feelings into the "dry" narrations. Not only Steger and his team members reduce Bancroft to her female attributes but also the press is focused on her and how she is doing during the expedition. When Bancroft has an accident in the sixth week, she is calm and collected afterwards. However, in the media this accident is the most discussed event of their journey to the Pole. Society does not have confidence in women to work equally with men. Peary himself asked for "Someone who has the big, masculine literary instinct" showing his critical attitude towards women as writers.

Man vs. nature
Steger’s expedition team is dependent on the weather since if there is too much fog or storm, they are not able to carry on with their journey. They receive messages via satellite beacons to get information about the weather forecast. On Day 30 and Day 31 the team cannot continue traveling due to the windy weather thus the fate goes hand in hand with nature. The team accepts the storm and tries to gain back their power for the journey through sleeping. The nature with its changing weather is more powerful than the human beings and determines people's behavior seen in the example of Mantell. Due to his injury he has to leave the Pole. This shows that fate is connected with nature and is more dominant than the men. The weather phenomenon concerning the ice conditions relates to the fact whether there are gaps in the ice or if the ice is thick enough. The landscape in Steger’s story is often fragmented which prevents the team to move on with their journey. Since this expedition took place in 1986, this situation has even become more serious due to climate change. James D. Ford and Tristan Pearce (2010) discuss in their article research about the Inuvialuit Settlement Region (ISR) in the Western Canadian arctic and reveal that "more unpredictable weather, changing ice dynamics with thinner ice and earlier ice- break- up" will occur.  Human beings are dependent on the weather including its climate change conditions since the people living there are reliant on the food transport. In Steger's story the thin ice is a problem because it means a delay for their journey, which stresses the superiority of nature and that people have to deal with the vulnerability of the climate. Not only ice conditions and cold temperatures can be problematic for the team but also the Transpolar Drift Stream shows its power: “Furthermore, we knew that if we slept, we’d be placing ourselves at the mercy of the Transpolar Drift Stream and would likely awaken farther away from the Pole". The determination of Steger’s team does not only make for progress but also prevents them from losing much time and encountering dangerous situations.

Collaboration
One important motif in Steger’s North to the Pole is the collaboration and team spirit among the exploration team. Their vision to get to the Pole like Peary did in 1909 can only work if they stick together and collaborate with each other.The team again has struggles with the ice conditions. They often encounter fragmented ice meaning big gaps which are impossible to cross with their sleds. Boddy is stopped by an open lead, "bronze-colored water that stretched across our route". While the others are looking for a closed passage to pass, Schurke comes up with the solution of a "bridge- building project". Teamwork is required since one person on its own could never manage heaping ice blocks in this short time due to especially physical matters. After passing this lead successfully, Steger writes: “We applauded ourselves for this successful lead- crossing strategy, and enjoyed a sense of unity”. Pride and optimism become apparent through this collaboration and in particular the team spirit is stressed. The team feels united and realizes that working together brings them closer to their goal. Steger himself emphasizes the important contribution of Schurke to the team's success when claiming "A day’s travel on the wrong bearing would cost us the Pole". He stresses "the massive responsibility" and also his "complete faith in Schurke’s ability" which points out a lot of respect for his work and that he appreciates his help. Furthermore, Weber's qualities to bear responsibility for someone else's dog team are mentioned: “And Richard did an admirable job even of taking over someone else’s team, which is a frustrating job even under the best conditions”. Weber's contribution to the team is indicated, namely being a leading figure, flexible and mentally strong to push the explorer team forward.  Collaboration was already required when Robert Peary did his final attempt to reach the North Pole from 1908 to 1909. Robert Bartlett (1875– 1946) was the captain of Peary's ship called "Roosevelt" as Deirdre C. Stam elaborates in the article "Interpreting captain Bob Bartlett’s AGS notebook chronicling significant parts of Peary’s 1908– 09 North Pole expedition" for the National Geographic. Bartlett "also took part in Peary’s elaborate system of successive support teams travelling to and from Cape Columbia", from where he travelled by sledge to his polar target. Bartlett's contribution to the trip was also characterized by collaboration. Surprisingly, Peary did not take him to the Pole furthermore. He decided to replace him for Matthew Henson; he also considered him as a collaborative person. Nevertheless, this example of not fulfilling promises to captain Bartlett, in particular that he is not allowed to accompany Peary to the North Pole, despite his efforts and talent, does not support the idea of collaboration. Therefore, a sort of collaboration is necessary to go to the Pole together as a team, even though in this example the responsible people on Peary’s last attempt were exchanged.

Determination
The determination of each team member is enormous and is the leading factor for that journey, although the determination is challenged at times in that expedition. If anyone of the crew had not been determined to go on that expedition, none of them would have chosen to go. Thus, determination can be regarded as a basic requirement for starting that journey to the North Pole. In the beginning, Steger already states that their determination "[is] as strong as ever" and has been there from an early age on. About his childhood he says:“Ever since I was a child, I had dreamed about the remote places of the world, like the one the North Star leads to. I was a born explorer". All of the other team members have drawn their focus to the explorer life more or less from an early age on. Determination is also linked here with hard work and a strong belief and trust in one's own skills. Steger’s parents already taught him at an early age that "they could reach [their] goals if [they are] willing to work very hard for them". In addition to that, the hard work and strong will they put into the expedition is shown in their extensive and tedious training they go through prior to this expedition. It took three years of planning, training and preparing and a lot of money to make that expedition happen- Determination is the key in that regard to stay focused and hooked on such a thing. The fact that Steger and Schurke are constantly rearranging their strategy contributes to that as well. They want to make the most efficient progress to reach their goal. However, determination is challenged at times too. In week three of the expedition Stege] writes:” We had sensed seeds of disillusionment among the team regarding our plan to reach the Pole". Week three is a particularly challenging phase of the expedition. The crew fears that they are not going to accomplish their goal of reaching the Pole without resupply and McKerrow also announces that he is going to leave the expedition due to health issues. After the first airlift the mood of the crew is up again, though, and they find their motivation once more. Determination is something that Steger and Co. share with the world's great explorers Nansen and Peary, "who were drawn north by the polar spirit" as well.

Interdependence
To achieve their goal of reaching the pole the crew is dependent on several external forces and is in a state of interdependence, especially with their sled-dogs. On Day 51 of the journey, Steger and Schurke are writing that the crew is tired and exhausted and "plagued by sore feet". But what is even worse for the crew in that situation is that their dogs are terribly exhausted and languishing as well. The worst aspect though, is that one of their strongest and "most consistent" dogs, named Dillon, collapsed. That does not only force them to pause and recline, but also leads to trouble in their tight schedule. The crew does seem to know that they heavily rely on their dogs, which is pointed out in the fact that the dog is given an extra ration of food on that day. Further into the story, on Day 54 it is written:

"All of the dogs were now completely famished, but their spirits were still good. Our dog-food supply was nearly exhausted, so to keep them going we had given up our own rations of pemmican, butter, and the nut-butter bars we ate for lunch. "(Steger, Schurke 295)

A mutual dependency is noticeable here, pointing to interdependence. The crew apparently needs the sled dogs for locomotion, but on the other hand the dogs also need the people for nutrition. In this case the crew even prefers the certainty of the dogs’ well-being, instead of their own. The crew is aware of the physical hardships that the dogs endure during journeys such as these, and try to meet their needs. Steger writes in regard to this: “The dogs sense when we are hungry, tired, and cold. They know that our survival is linked with theirs. For me, the mystique of long treks by dogsled lies in this bond”. The team depends on a good bond between people and dogs, because only then the crew is able to rely on the dogs’ response to commands for example. The interdependence is thereby of huge importance here to make their dream come true.

The interdependence between humans and dogs in that expedition is characterized by "mutual respect" and "develops a lasting relationship, one that is based on trust, respect, and affection". Thus, the crew looks after the dogs’ needs and takes break whenever they feel they are exhausted. Kerrie Ann Shannon writes in her MA thesis in regard to the unique role of sled dogs in Inuit culture: “The concepts of reciprocity and sharing, respect, and continuity are important in a relationship with animals and this relationship in turn influences human social interaction”. A good relationship between humans and dogs is therefore crucial and has a great influence on the social interaction of them and also on the success of that expedition.

Bibliography
Primary Literature:
Steger, W. and Schurke, P. (1987): “North to the Pole” United States: Minnesota Historical Society Press.
Secondary Literature:
Ford, James D and Tristan Pearce (2010) “What we know, do not know, and need to know about climate change vulnerability in the western Canadian Arctic: a systematic literature review” Environ. Res. Lett. 5 014008
Freeman, D. (2015) (https://www.nationalgeographic.com/adventure/adventure-blog/2015/05/07/polar-explorer-will-steger-still-testing-the-limits/      	Accessed October 22, 2019,
Robinson, M. (2015) “Manliness and Exploration: The Discovery of the North Pole” Osiris 30: 89- 109
Shannon, K. (1997) “The unique role of sled dogs in Inuit culture” Canada: University of Alberta, Edmonton
Stam, D. C. (2017) “Interpreting Captain Bob Bartlett’s AGS notebook chronicling significant parts of Peary’s 1908– 09 North Pole expedition” Geographical Review 107 (1): 185- 206. Downloaded October 24, 2019,
Sullivan, R. (1989) https://www.si.com/vault/1989/07/31/120259/the-iceman-cometh-will-steger-once-a-footloose-north-woods-hippie-conquered-boardrooms-and-blizzards-to-lead-a-historic-expedition-to-the-north-pole-in-1986-now-he-means-to-traverse-antarctica  Accessed October 22, 2019,
Wren, Christopher S. (1986) https://www.nytimes.com/1986/05/06/science/back-from-pole-explorer-describes-grueling-trek.html  	 Accessed October 22, 2019,
Websites mentioned: 
The American Polar Society https://www.americanpolar.org/about/polar-luminaries/will-steger/ Accessed October 22, 2019,
International Polar Foundation http://www.explorapoles.org/explorers/profile/steger_will  Accessed October 22, 2019,
Pictures:
Climate Generation  https://www.climategen.org/blog/paul-schurke-explorers-modern
Accessed October 29, 2019,
Climate Generation https://www.climategen.org/who-we-are/our-approach/
Accessed October 29, 2019



1986 books
American books